Jack McCauley Jebb (born 11 September 1995) is an English professional footballer who plays for Havant & Waterlooville on loan from Dorking Wanderers.

Club career
Dubbed the "new Jack Wilshere" and described as a "technically-gifted central midfielder", Jebb signed his first professional contract with Arsenal in September 2012. Having played regularly for Arsenal's Under-18s, Jebb joined League Two club Stevenage on a one-month loan on 16 October 2014. He made his league debut for Stevenage two days later against Accrington Stanley, coming on as a 56th-minute substitute for Dean Parrett.

Jebb rejoined Stevenage on loan until the end of the 2014–15 season on 26 March 2015. He joined the club on a one-year deal on 1 September 2015. He was released by Stevenage at the end of the 2015–16 season.

Jebb joined League Two Newport County on 8 November 2016 on a short-term contract and made his debut the same day in the starting line-up for the EFL Trophy match against AFC Wimbledon. Newport won the game 2–0. He was released by Newport on 9 January 2017.

After leaving Newport, Jebb signed for National League side Sutton United. On 11 February 2017, Jebb made his first appearance for Sutton in a 3–0 away defeat to Solihull Moors, coming on as a 56th-minute substitute for Dan Spence. He made his full club debut three days later on 14 February in a 2–1 away defeat to Guiseley. On 5 April, Jebb came on as a 71st-minute substitute to score his first goal for Sutton in a 3–2 loss to Tranmere Rovers.

On 8 June 2022, Jebb joined newly promoted National League side Dorking Wanderers following his departure from Dartford.

On 4 March 2023, Jebb joined National League South side Havant & Waterlooville on loan till end of the season.

International career
Jebb featured for England at schoolboy level picking up caps in the U16 and U17 levels. He scored a headed goal in a final for England U17s versus Portugal at Northampton's Sixfields Stadium and helped the side retain the FA International U17 Tournament trophy. He was also selected for the European Championship Elite Qualifying Round squad in 2012.

Career statistics

References

External links

England profile at the FA

1995 births
Living people
English footballers
Footballers from Kensington
England youth international footballers
Arsenal F.C. players
Stevenage F.C. players
Newport County A.F.C. players
Sutton United F.C. players
Welling United F.C. players
Dartford F.C. players
Dorking Wanderers F.C. players
Association football midfielders
English Football League players
National League (English football) players